Wolter (or Walter) von Plettenberg (c. 1450 – February 28, 1535) was the Master (Landmeister) of the Livonian Order from 1494 to 1535 and one of the greatest leaders of the Teutonic knights. He was an important early Baltic German.

Biography 
Wolter von Plettenberg was born in Welver (in Meyerich Castle), Westphalia. Belonging to the House of Plettenberg, he was the first child of his father Berthold von Plettenberg and his mother Gosteke Lappe, but had at least seven siblings. He went to work at the Fort of Narva at the age of ten and joined the Teutonic Order when he was about 14.
In 1489 he was elected to marshal of the Order (Landmarschall), in 1491 he fought successfully against the city of Riga and was elected master in 1494. That same year Moscow closed down the Hanseatic office in Novgorod and imprisoned Hanseatic merchants (most of them Livonians) there. Livonia was drifting into war with Muscovite Russia. After negotiations in 1498 failed, Plettenberg chose to prepare for pre-emptive attack against Pskov, which was then still a formally independent state, but under heavy influence from Moscow.
In 1500 Plettenberg made an alliance with Grand Duke of Lithuania, Alexander Jagiellon (the Treaty of Wenden), who had been at war with Russia since 1499. He also tried to convince Pope Alexander VI to issue a crusading bull against the Russians in order to acquire funding from the sale of indulgences, but his efforts were in vain.

In the war with Russia (1501-1503), Plettenberg showed himself to be a talented and skilled commander. His strength lay in his skillful use of heavy cavalry and artillery fire. With such tactics Plettenberg won the Battle of the Siritsa River (August 1501), where an army of the Livonian Confederation of 8,000 foot and 4,000 horse defeated an about two times stronger army of Russians. But without the promised help of the Lithuanians, Plettenberg was unable to conquer Pskov and only burned the stronghold of Ostrov.
During the winter of 1501–1502, the Russians harshly ravaged Eastern Livonia and many Livonian dignitaries wanted to make peace with Muscovy. But Plettenberg decided to continue the war and tried to conquer Pskov one more time. However, due to Moscow's strong support of Pskov, he was forced to retreat southwest from the city. On 13 September 1502 he won the Battle of Smolin (at Lake Smolin close to the village Palkino in Pskov Oblast) with his 5,000 men against about 12,000 Russians. The next day, 14 September, became the Victory Day in Livonia. In 1503 peace between Ivan III and Livonia on the terms of status quo ante bellum was concluded.

During the Protestant Reformation, Plettenberg supported the Lutherans, hoping thus to subjugate the Catholic Archbishopric of Riga to him. The province was in disarray and the master had serious difficulties in ruling the territory which remained divided between the Order, the bishoprics, and the rich cities of Riga, Reval and Dorpat. In 1525 Plettenberg refused to convert himself to Lutheranism and to become a secular ruler of Livonia as the Grand Master Albert in Prussia had done. Instead he became vassal or Imperial Prince (Reichsfürst) of the Emperor Charles V, thus hoping to get direct support from the Holy Roman Empire. In March of the year 1535 he died quite suddenly at the age of about 85 years. According to legend, he died in full armor, sitting in front of a fireplace in an armchair. He is buried in Cesis at St. John's church.

Legacy
Traditionally, both Baltic Germans and Estonian historians have considered Plettenberg one of the most capable and successful leaders in Livonian history, the former having called him one of the greatest masters of the order and a national hero. His bust was included in the German Walhalla memorial.

Two books have been written that focus on Plettenberg: Hans-Friedrich Blunck's Wolter von Plettenberg, Deutschordensmeister in Livland (1938) and Mia Munier-Wroblewski's Zeitenwende, Ein Deutschordensroman (1939). Additionally, Plettenberg has been featured in several fictional works.

Many sculptures have been made of Plettenberg. The most famous is a bust located in the Walhalla memorial and a wooden statue located in Riga.

In 2015, the Bank of Latvia located in Riga issued a collector coin on the 500th anniversary of the Riga Castle that depicted the castle along with Plettenberg and the Virgin Mary.

See also 
 House of Plettenberg

References 

 

1450s births
1535 deaths
House of Plettenberg
Baltic-German people
Masters of the Livonian Order
People from Soest (district)